Gibson Creek (also called Gibson Branch) is a stream in Franklin County in the U.S. state of Missouri. It is a tributary to the Meramec River.

Gibson Creek has the name of William Gibson, a pioneer citizen.

See also
List of rivers of Missouri

References

Rivers of Franklin County, Missouri
Rivers of Missouri